The Kindly Ones (1996) is the ninth collection of issues in the DC Comics series, The Sandman. Written by Neil Gaiman, illustrated by Marc Hempel, Richard Case, D'Israeli, Teddy Kristiansen, Glyn Dillon, Charles Vess, Dean Ormston and Kevin Nowlan, coloured by Daniel Vozzo, and lettered by Todd Klein.The volume features an introduction by Frank McConnell.

The issues in the collection first appeared in 1993, 1994 and 1995. The collection first appeared in paperback and hardback in 1996.

Marc Hempel is the primary penciller, inked variously by himself, D'Israeli and Richard Case.  He is relieved at different points in the story by Teddy Kristiansen, Glyn Dillon and Dean Ormston, and Charles Vess draws a story within a story sequence. Kevin Nowlan draws a short story which originally appeared in a Vertigo promo book.

It was preceded by Worlds' End and followed by The Wake.

Synopsis

The Kindly Ones belongs with the second collection, The Doll's House, and the seventh, Brief Lives, in that it finishes off a story that mostly originated in these collections; but includes elements of Season of Mists and the story of Orpheus, told mostly in Fables and Reflections. A character from A Game of You, which also has its roots in The Doll's House, also appears. The most structurally ambitious of the collections, The Kindly Ones is a single storyline written as a Greek tragedy, with Morpheus as its doomed hero and an aspect of the triad of witches, the Erinyes, as the Greek chorus. It pulls together various threads left dangling throughout the series, notably the grudges against Morpheus of several characters: Hippolyta Hall; the witches themselves; the Norse god Loki; and the witch Thessaly. The Kindly Ones also continues several other stories, including that of Cluracan of Faerie and his sister Nuala; that of the Corinthian; and that of Rose Walker and her former landlord Hal.

After Daniel is kidnapped by Loki and Robin Goodfellow, his mother Lyta convinces herself that Morpheus has killed him and resolves to destroy Morpheus; and finally persuades the Erinyes to do so. In many places, Lyta is depicted as Medusa, and even encounters Medusa's two sisters, Stheno and Euryale. Unbeknownst to Lyta, Daniel is recovered alive and well by Morpheus' servants, the raven Matthew and a restored Corinthian. In a misunderstanding of tragic proportions, the Erinyes continually accuse Morpheus of having killed his son, and while this is not true in Daniel's case it is true in the case of Orpheus, which weighs on Morpheus greatly. At length, Morpheus yields to the Erinyes, and the main story ends with Morpheus and his sister Death on a desolate peak with a flock of pigeons; echoing a sequence from one of the series' early high points, "The Sound of her Wings" (issue #8). Death asks for Morpheus' hand, and he disappears. Immediately upon the death of Morpheus, Daniel becomes a new aspect of Dream, with white clothes and hair, and an emerald suspended on his neck and chest.

Issues collected

Reception
Steve Faragher reviewed Sandman: The Kindly Ones for Arcane magazine, rating it a 9 out of 10 overall. Faragher comments that "This is still one of the greatest tales ever told in a graphic novel and is essential reading for anyone who wants to try and tell believable and yet fantastical episodic stories. Gaiman is a master of his craft."

References

Further reading

External links
 The Annotated Sandman

1996 graphic novels
Comic book collection books